Karlsen Rock is a submerged rock lying  north-northwest of Penguin Point, the northwesternmost point of Coronation Island in the South Orkney Islands. It was charted and named on a map by Petter Sørlle, a Norwegian whaler who made a running survey of the South Orkney Islands in 1912–13.

References

External links

Rock formations of the South Orkney Islands